Silk + Steel was the second album released by American rock band Giuffria in 1986. It was produced by Pat Glasser, who was at the time also the producer of Giuffria's MCA labelmates Night Ranger. The band covered "I Must Be Dreaming", a Willy DeVille song that went to No. 52 on the Billboard Hot 100. The record's peak position on The Billboard 200 was No. 60 on June 21, 1986.

Track listing
All tracks by Gregg Giuffria and David Glen Eisley, except where indicated

 "No Escape" - 5:29
 "Love You Forever" - 4:00
 "I Must Be Dreaming" (Willy DeVille) - 4:24 (Mink DeVille cover)
 "Girl" - 4:29
 "Change of Heart" - 3:35
 "Radio" (Giuffria, Eisley, Cordola) - 4:27
 "Heartache" - 3:48
 "Lethal Lover" (Giuffria, Eisley, Cordola) - 4:21
 "Tell It Like It Is" - 4:06
 "Dirty Secrets" - 4:41

2000 remastered edition bonus track
"Say It Ain't True" - 3:45 (from the soundtrack of the movie Gotcha!)

Personnel
 David Glen Eisley - lead and backing vocals, harmonica, producer on track 7, mixing
 Lanny Cordola - guitar, backing vocals
 Gregg Giuffria - keyboards, backing vocals, vocoder, producer on track 7, mixing
 David Sikes - bass, backing vocals
 Alan Krigger - drums

Production
 Pat Glasser - producer
 Rick DeLena - additional recordings, engineer, mixing
 Bill Freesh, John Van Nest - engineers
 Steve Hirsch - additional recordings, assistant engineer
 Stephen Marcussen - mastering

References

1986 albums
Giuffria albums
MCA Records albums